The Juno Award for "Classical Album of the Year" for ensembles has been awarded since 1985 (under four award headings), as recognition each year for the best classical music album in Canada.

Winners

Best Classical Album:  Large Ensemble or Soloist(s) With Large Ensemble Accompaniment (1985–1987)
1985 – Orchestre symphonique de Montreal, Charles Dutoit – Conductor, Ravel: Ma Mere L'oye/Pavane Pour un Infante Debunte/Tombeau de Couperin And Valses Nobles et Sentimentales
1986 – Toronto Symphony, Andrew Davis – Conductor, Holst: The Planets
1987 – Orchestre symphonique de Montreal, Charles Dutoit – Conductor, Holst, The Planets

Best Classical Album (Large Ensemble) (1989–1999)
1989 – Montreal Symphony Orchestra, Charles Dutoit – Conductor, Bartók: Concerto for Orchestra; Music For Strings, Percussion and Celesta
1990 – Tafelmusik Baroque Orchestra, Boccherini: Cello Concertos and Symphonies
1991 – Orchestre symphonique de Montreal, Charles Dutoit – Conductor, Debussy: Images, Nocturnes
1992 – Orchestre symphonique de Montreal, Charles Dutoit – Conductor, Debussy: Pelleas et Melisande
1993 – Tafelmusik Baroque Orchestra, with Alan Curtis/Catherine Robbin/ Linda Maguire/Nancy Argenta/Ingrid Attrot/Mel Braun, Jeanne Lamon – Leader, Handel: Excerpts From Floridante
1994 – Tafelmusik Baroque Orchestra, Jeanne Lamon – Director, Handel: Concerti Grossi, Op.3 No. 1-6
1995 – Tafelmusik Baroque Orchestra, Jeanne Lamon – Director, Bach: Brandenburg Concertos Nos. 1–6
1996 – Orchestre symphonique de Montreal, Charles Dutoit – Conductor], Shostakovich: Symphonies 5 & 9
1997 – I Musici de Montréal, Ginastera/Villa-Lobos/Evangelista
1998 – James Sommerville; CBC Vancouver Orchestra; Mario Bernardi, Mozart Horn Concertos
1999 – Tafelmusik Baroque Orchestra, Jeanne Lamon – musical director, Handel: Music For The Royal Fireworks

Best Classical Album:  Large Ensemble or Soloist(s) With Large Ensemble Accompaniment (2000–2002)
2000 – Orchestre Symphonique de Montréal, Respighi: La Boutique Fantasque
2001 – Toronto Symphony Orchestra, Jukka-Pekka Saraste – conductor, Sibelius: Lemminkäinen Suite – Night Ride and Sunrise
2002 – James Ehnes (violin), Orchestre Symphonique de Montréal, Charles Dutoit – conductor, Max Bruch, Concertos 1 & 3

Classical Album of the Year: Large Ensemble or Soloist(s) With Large Ensemble Accompaniment (2003 – Present)
2003 – James Ehnes/Mario Bernardi/Orchestre symphonique de Montréal, Bruch Concertos: Vol II
2004 – André Laplante (piano), Christopher Millard (bassoon), Robert Cram (flute), Joaquin Valdepenas (clarinet), CBC Radio Orchestra, Mario Bernardi – conductor, Concertos: Music of Jacques Hétu
2005 – Jeanne Lamon, Tafelmusik Baroque Orchestra, Dardanus/Le temple de la gloire: Music of Jean-Phillippe Rameau
2006 – Tafelmusik Baroque Orchestra, Bruno Weil, Beethoven: Symphonies nos. 5 et 6
2007 – James Ehnes and the Mozart Anniversary Orchestra, Mozart: Violin Concerti
2008 – James Ehnes/Bramwell Tovey/Vancouver Symphony Orchestra, Korngold, Barber & Walton Violin Concertos
2009 – Orchestre symphonique de Montréal/Kent Nagano, Beethoven: Ideals Of The French Revolution
2010 – Alain Lefèvre/London Mozart Players, Mathieu, Shostakovich, Mendelssohn: Concertino & Concertos
2011 – Scott St. John/Lara St. John, Mozart: Scott and Lara St. John/The Knights
2012 – Alexandre Da Costa/Orchestre Symphonique de Montréal, Daugherty: Fire and Blood
2013 – James Ehnes, Tchaikovsky: Violin Concerto
2014 – James Ehnes, Britten & Shostakovich: Violin Concerti
2015 – Angela Hewitt, MOZART: Piano Concertos Nos. 22 & 24
2016 – Orchestre Symphonique de Montréal with Olivier Latry and Jean-Willy Kunz, Symphony and New Works for Organ and Orchestra
2017 – Steve Wood and the Northern Cree Singers, Tanya Tagaq, Winnipeg Symphony Orchestra, Going Home Star – Truth and Reconciliation
2018 – Jan Lisiecki with NDR Elbphilharmonie Orchestra, Chopin: Works for Piano & Orchestra
2019 – Toronto Symphony Orchestra conducted by Peter Oundjian feat. Louis Lortie, Sarah Jeffrey and Teng Li, Vaughan Williams
2020 – Montreal Symphony Orchestra conducted by Kent Nagano, The John Adams Album
2021 – Montreal Symphony Orchestra conducted by Kent Nagano feat. Andrew Wan, Ginastera - Bernstein - Moussa: Œuvres pour violon et orchestre/Works for Violin and Orchestra
2022 - L'Harmonie des saisons conducted by Eric Milnes ft. Hélène Brunet, Solfeggio

References

Classical Album - Large Ensemble
Classical music awards
Album awards